Temürtas was also the name of another Chupanid; see Timurtash.

Temürtas was the eldest son of the Chupanids prince Malek Ashraf.

Profile
In 1357, Temürtas' father was executed by the forces of the Blue Horde under Jani Beg, and his lands were annexed by the Mongols. In 1360 Temürtas made a bid for the former Chupanid lands, which had by this time fallen into the hands of the Jalayirids of Baghdad under Shaikh Uvais. Hizr, who became khan of the Blue Horde that same year, initially assisted him, but afterwards changed his mind and handed him over to Shaikh Uvais.

Chobanids